{{Infobox person
| name               = Kevin M. Connolly
| image              = Kevin M. Connolly Cropped Wiki.jpg
| alt                = 
| caption            = Connolly in November 2009
| birth_name         = Kevin Miguel Connolly
| birth_date         = 
| birth_place        = Tucson, Arizona, U.S.
| death_date         = 
| death_place        =
| alma_mater         = {{Ubl
  | University of the Incarnate Word
  | University of California, Los Angeles  }}
| occupation         = 
| years_active       =
}}Kevin Miguel Connolly (born 1974) is an American voice actor, ADR director and script writer. He is known for anime dub voice acting for Funimation, and his first major anime role was Harley Hartwell in Case Closed. He has gone on to voice several major roles in Funimation anime titles, including Kain Fuery in the popular series Fullmetal Alchemist and the lead protagonist Takayuki Narumi in Rumbling Hearts. He has also done voice work for ADV Films, Bang Zoom! Entertainment, and Illumitoon Entertainment. He has since relocated to Los Angeles, California.'Dubbing roles
Anime
 AM Driver – Roshette Keith
 BECK: Mongolian Chop Squad – Tanabe
 Beet the Vandel Buster – Cruss
 Big Windup! – Motoki Haruna
 Blue Exorcist – Nagatomo
 B't X – Prof. Kotaro 'Kit' Takamiya
 Case Closed (Funimation dub) – Harley Hartwell
 Darker Than Black – Alain (Ep. 1–2)
 Detective Conan: The Fist of Blue Sapphire – Leon Lowe
 Fullmetal Alchemist series – Kain Fuery
 The Galaxy Railways – Terry Goldman (Ep. 4)
 Guyver: The Bio-Boosted Armor – Officer Tsutomu Tanaka
 Hell Girl – Daisuke Iwashita (Ep. 3)
 Hunter x Hunter – Kastro
 Kodocha – Naozumi's Manager
 Mushishi – Kai (Ep. 18)
 Nura: Rise of the Yokai Clan – Demon Capital – Abe no Seimei
 One Piece (Funimation dub) – Pell, Zabo
 Ouran High School Host Club – Tomochika Sayko (Ep. 14)
 Pokémon Evolutions – Wyndon Stadium Announcer
 Ranking of Kings – Sorii
 Rumbling Hearts – Takayuki Narumi
 School Rumble – Shigeo Umezu
 Science Ninja Team Gatchaman (ADV dub) – MC (Ep. 66), Additional Voices
 Shin-Chan (Funimation dub) – Doyle
 Suzuka – Soichi Miyamoto
 Sword Art Online – Heathcliff
 The Saint's Magic Power is Omnipotent – Siegfried Salutania
 Tsubasa: Reservoir Chronicle – Fujitaka Kinomoto (Ep. 12, 17, 31)
 Witchblade – Yagi

Video games
 Ace Combat 7: Skies Unknown – AWACS Bandog
 Detective Conan: The Mirapolis Investigation – Harley Hartwell
 One-Punch Man: A Hero Nobody Knows – Additional voices
 Sengoku Basara: Samurai Heroes – Additional voices (warriors)

Staff work
English dubbing director
 Linebarrels of Iron – ADR Script
 One Piece – ADR Script
 Peach Girl – ADR Director
 School Rumble'' – ADR Director

References

External links
 Kevin M. Connolly's Official Website
 
 
 
 Kevin M. Connolly at CrystalAcids Anime Voice Actor Database

1974 births
Date of birth missing (living people)
Living people
American male screenwriters
American male voice actors
American television writers
Male actors from Los Angeles
Male actors from Tucson, Arizona
American male television writers
Screenwriters from Arizona
Screenwriters from California
UCLA Film School alumni
University of the Incarnate Word alumni
American voice directors
Writers from Los Angeles
Writers from Tucson, Arizona
21st-century American male actors